Brickellia worthingtonii is a North American species of flowering plants in the family Asteraceae. It is native to northern Mexico in the state of Durango.

Brickellia worthingtonii is a subshrub up to 60 cm (24 inches) tall. It has numerous small, nodding (hanging) flower heads.

The species is named for US botanist Richard D. Worthington.

References

worthingtonii
Flora of Durango
Plants described in 1990